The 2016–17 season was the 27th edition of Bayern Munich's women's section since the creation of the Frauen Bundesliga. In it the team tried to defend its second consecutive Frauen Bundesliga title and made its third appearance in the UEFA Women's Champions League.

Summary
Bayern had successfully defended its first Bundesliga title and won the 2015–16 championship too with a 10 points advantage over Wolfsburg – the largest gap between the league's champion and runner-up since the 2001–02 edition. On the other hand, in its return to the UEFA Women's Champions League, where Wolfsburg lost the final on penalties against Olympique Lyonnais, Bayern failed to progress  to the later stages and was knocked out by Twente on away goals in the Round of 32. In the DFB-Pokal the team reached the semifinals, where it was eliminated by the sensation of the competition, Sand.

The day after the DFB-Pokal elimination, Bayern announced its first signing for the 2016–17 season, international Verena Faißt from Wolfsburg. Before the end of the Bundesliga another experienced German international was signed, Frankfurt's Simone Laudehr, while Eunice Beckmann left the club for NWSL's Boston Breakers.

Few days after the final Bundesliga game against Hoffenheim Bayern signed midfielder Anna Gerhardt coming from Köln, which had just been relegated. She has followed one month later by Dutch defender Stefanie van der Gragt from Twente and Jacintha Weimar, who replaced Fabienne Weber as Bayern's third goalkeeper. On the other hand, Paris St.-Germain signed Spanish midfielder Vero Boquete, and Laura Feiersinger and Raffaella Manieri, who had played few games in the 2015–16 season, signed for Sand and Brescia respectively.

Bayern failed to win its two first Bundesliga home games, tying 1–1 against Freiburg and losing 1–2 against title contender Wolfsburg. However, the team won all away games in the Bundesliga up to March, chaining six victories until they lost 1–2 against Turbine Potsdam, back to the top positions after a disappointing 2015–16 season, on December 11. Meanwhile, Bayern had easily knocked out the Scottish and Russian runners-up Hibernian and Rossiyanka by wide aggregates (10–1 and 8–0 respectively) in the Champions League and reached the quarterfinals for the first time. Lastly it progressed easily past lower-division teams 1. FC Riegelsberg (0–15) and Arminia Ibbenbüren (0–8) in the DFB-Pokal.

In November, following the end of the 2016 Damallsvenskan, signed Fridolina Rolfö from champion Linköping. One month later Claire Falknor, having played no Bundesliga games in the first half of the season, departed to the NWSL.

On January 9 Melanie Behringer was nominated in the successor of the FIFA Women's World Player, The Best Awards. Bayern was the only team with more than one player in the top 5 positions, as Sara Däbritz ranked fifth. Meanwhile, the team held a training stage in Andalusia during the winter interseason, in which they defeated Arsenal 3–1 in a charitable friendly played in Betis' home ground.

Back into official action, Bayern defeated Freiburg and Jena before facing two crucial games against Wolfsburg in March. They lost both by 0–2 as Wolfsburg knocked them out of the DFB Pokal in the quarterfinals and set course for the title. Next they faced the Champions League's quarterfinals against 2014–15 runner-up Paris St.-Germain. Bayern won the first leg by 1–0 but suffered a 4–0 defeat in the Parc des Princes. Thus the team ended March out of the Champions League and the Pokal and with few options of winning the Bundesliga.

From April Bayern won the next three Bundesliga games before losing 4–2 against Frankfurt. On May 11 it defeated Borussia Mönchengladbach but lost all mathematical options to win the championship with Wolfsburg's 2–1 victory over Essen. Bayern now faced a head-to-head match for the other Champions League spot against Turbine Potsdam. They won it with a remarkable 0–4 scoreline, and sealed their qualification in the last game by defeating Essen by 2–0.

Transfers

Results

 
Numbers in brackets in league games show the team's position in the table following the match

Preseason and interseason

UEFA Women's Champions League

Frauen Bundesliga

Frauen DFB-Pokal

Bundesliga statistics

1 Senior internationals in bold

References

2016–17 in German women's football
Bayern Munich women
Women's football club seasons